Affiliated Foods Southwest was a retailers' cooperative serving independent supermarkets in Arkansas, Louisiana, Mississippi, Oklahoma, Tennessee, and Texas. It was founded in 1948 by C. E. "Doc" Toland, who had worked in a cooperative in Little Rock, Arkansas called Model Markets. It was a member of Retailer Owned Food Distributors & Associates and distributed Shurfine products in its stores.

Affiliated Foods Southwest also operated several Harvest Foods grocery stores in Arkansas.

The company declared bankruptcy on May 5, 2009. It was acquired by Associated Wholesale Grocers.

References

External links 
 Affiliated Foods Southwest web site
Harvest Foods website

Companies based in Little Rock, Arkansas
Companies based in Arkansas
American companies established in 1948
Retail companies established in 1948
American companies disestablished in 2009
Retail companies disestablished in 2009
Economy of the Southeastern United States
Economy of the Southwestern United States
Supermarkets of the United States
Retailers' cooperatives in the United States